Shrirang Jadhav (15 November 1927 – 1984) was an Indian wrestler. He competed in the men's freestyle light heavyweight at the 1952 Summer Olympics.

References

External links
 

1927 births
1984 deaths
Indian male sport wrestlers
Olympic wrestlers of India
Wrestlers at the 1952 Summer Olympics
Place of birth missing